Mike Wilpolt (born January 4, 1968) is a former American football wide receiver/defensive back for the Charlotte Rage (1992–1993), the Las Vegas Sting (1994–1995), and the Anaheim Piranhas (1996) in the Arena Football League (AFL). He also coached for 10 years in the AFL with the Indiana Firebirds, Los Angeles Avengers and Cleveland Gladiators.

Professional career

Key: Rec - receptions; Yards - Yards gained through receptions; TD - receiving touchdowns

Coaching career

Albany Firebirds
Wilpolt was the special teams coordinator for the Albany Firebirds, helping them win Back-to-Back Eastern Division Titles in 1999–2000. Wilpolt helped lead the Firebirds to the 1999 AFL World Championship, winning Arena Bowl XIII.

Indiana Firebirds
Wilpolt was the head coach in 2004 for the Indiana Firebirds. He took over the Firebirds after Steve DeBerg was fired after an 0–5 start to the season. Wilpolt led the Firebirds to eight wins in their last 11 games and were favored by many to win the 2005 championship, but the Firebirds folded before the 2005 season started due to an ownership dispute.

Los Angeles Avengers
Wilpolt was signed by the Los Angeles Avengers as the team's defensive coordinator in 2005. Over the course of the next 3 seasons, Wilpolt's defense has been in the top 5 twice and the top 10 all three years. He left the Avengers on October 10, 2007, when he was named the new head coach of the Las Vegas Gladiators who then relocated to Cleveland, Ohio.

Cleveland Gladiators
In week 1, Wilpolt coached the Gladiators to a 61–49 victory against the New York Dragons in his first game as the team's head coach.  After their stunning victory over New York, Wilpolt led his team to a 66–63 victory over the Utah Blaze.  The following week, the Gladiators defeated the defending National Conference Champion Columbus Destroyers 66–63.  After losing three consecutive games, the Gladiators defeated the Los Angeles Avengers 83–69.  In just seven games, Wilpolt had doubled the number of wins the Gladiators had in 2007. Wilpolt finished the regular season with a 9–7 record, and a 2–1 record in the playoffs, helping them reach the AFL National Conference Championship Game.

Career win–loss record

Key: W: Wins; L: Losses; Div: Division W-L; Conf: Conference W-L; N/C: Non-conference W-L; Home: Home W-L; Road: Road W-L; PS: Points for; PA: Points against

Personal

References

1968 births
Living people
Players of American football from Colorado
People from the Denver metropolitan area
American football wide receivers
American football defensive backs
Colorado Mesa Mavericks football players
Charlotte Rage players
Las Vegas Sting players
Anaheim Piranhas players
Indiana Firebirds coaches
Cleveland Gladiators coaches
Los Angeles Avengers coaches